Santiago Giraldo was the defending champion but decided not to participate. Spanish Rubén Ramírez Hidalgo won the tournament with the score 3–6, 6–3, 6–4 in the final against Paolo Lorenzi.

Seeds

Draw

Finals

Top half

Bottom half

References
 Main Draw
 Qualifying Draw

San Luis Potosi Challenger - Singles
2012 Singles